is an agricultural town located in Kitakuwada District, Kyoto Prefecture, Japan.

As of 2003, the town had an estimated population of 5,070 and a density of 14.89 persons per km2. The total area was 340.47 km2.

On January 1, 2006, Miyama, along with the towns of Hiyoshi, Sonobe, and Yagi (all from Funai District), was merged to create the city of Nantan.

Tourism 
Miyama is best known for its thatched roof houses that create a rustic village ambience. Its top tourist attraction is Miyama Kayabuki-no-Sato.

Miyama is located 55km from Kyoto City. The various homestay options in the town facilitate short getaways for people who want a quick escape from city life.

External links 
 Official website of Nantan 

Dissolved municipalities of Kyoto Prefecture
Populated places disestablished in 2006
2006 disestablishments in Japan
Nantan, Kyoto